The men's shot put event at the 1998 World Junior Championships in Athletics was held in Annecy, France, at Parc des Sports on 31 July and 1 August.  A 7257g (Senior implement) shot was used.

Medalists

Results

Final
1 August

Qualifications
31 Jul

Group A

Group B

Participation
According to an unofficial count, 27 athletes from 21 countries participated in the event.

References

Shot put
Shot put at the World Athletics U20 Championships